The Journal of Perinatal & Neonatal Nursing is a peer-reviewed nursing journal of perinatal nursing and neonatal nursing. Each issue is presented in a topic-oriented format. It is popularly known as the "Pink Journal".

Abstracting and indexing 
The journal is covered by CINAHL. According to the Journal Citation Reports, the journal has a 2016 impact factor of 0.937.

References

External links 
 

Obstetrical nursing journals
Pediatric nursing journals
English-language journals
Quarterly journals
Lippincott Williams & Wilkins academic journals
Publications established in 1987
Hybrid open access journals